Anthony Kaldellis (born 29 November 1971) is a Greek-American historian who is Professor and a faculty member of the Department of Classics at the University of Chicago. He is a specialist in Greek historiography, Plato and Byzantine Studies. He is also the author of numerous monographs on classical antiquity and the Byzantine Empire, which have been translated into many languages.

Biography
Anthony Kaldellis was born on 29 November 1971 in Athens, Greece. He received his B.A. (1994) and Ph.D. (2001) in History from the University of Michigan. After gaining his Ph.D. Kaldellis has served as Assistant Professor (2001–2006), Associate Professor (2006–2007), Professor (2007–) and Chair (2015–) of the Department of Classics at Ohio State University.

Kaldellis is a member of the advisory boards of the Journal of Late Antiquity (2016–), Minerva (2013), and Greek, Roman, and Byzantine Studies (2008–); a member of the editorial boards of the Byzantine Greek series of the Dumbarton Oaks Medieval Library (2008–) and Estudios Bizantinos: Digital Journal of the Spanish Society of Byzantine Studies (2012–); and Associate Editor of Bryn Mawr Classical Review (2017–), of which he was Editor from 2010 to 2017. He has previously been Series Editor of Routledge Classical Translations (2011–2015), member of the editorial board of Medieval Confluences: Studies in the Intellectual History and Comparative History of Ideas of the Medieval World (2009–2019), and Review Editor of Speculum: A Journal of Medieval Studies (2006–2012).

Selected works
 The Argument of Psellos’ Chronographia, 1999
 Procopius of Caesarea: Tyranny, History, and Philosophy at the End of Antiquity, 2004
 Hellenism in Byzantium: The Transformations of Greek Identity and the Reception of the Classical Tradition, 2007
 The Christian Parthenon: Classicism and Pilgrimage in Byzantine Athens, 2010
 Ethnography after Antiquity: Foreign Lands and People in Byzantine Literature, 2014
 A New Herodotos: Laonikos Chalkokondyles on the Ottoman Empire, the Fall of Byzantium, and the Emergence of the West, 2014
 The Byzantine Republic: People and Power in New Rome, 2015
 Streams of Gold, Rivers of Blood: The Rise and Fall of Byzantium, 955 A.D. to the First Crusade, 2017
 A Cabinet of Byzantine Curiosities: Strange Tales and Surprising Facts from History's Most Orthodox Empire, 2017
 Romanland: Ethnicity and Empire in Byzantium, 2019
 Byzantium Unbound, 2019

Podcasts
Byzantium & Friends
An interview with Professor Anthony Kaldellis about his book The Byzantine Republic, from The History of Byzantium Podcast

Videos
 Interview with Dr. Anthony Kaldellis, The Institute for the Study of Western Civilization, Texas Tech University 
 Anthony Kaldellis on the Crisis of Hellenism, Society for the Preservation of Greek Heritage
 The Byzantines and the Classical Past (with Anthony Kaldellis)

See also
 Peter Heather

References

Sources

External links
 Anthony Kaldellis at Academia.edu
 Anthony Kaldellis at Regesta Imperii
 Byzantium and Friends podcast

Living people
Greek emigrants to the United States
American Byzantinists
Greek Byzantinists
Byzantinists
Historians of antiquity
Ohio State University faculty
University of Michigan alumni
Writers from Athens
1971 births
Scholars of Byzantine literature
Scholars of Byzantine history